Honest Hutch is a 1920 American comedy film directed by Clarence G. Badger, written by Arthur F. Statter and starring Will Rogers. The supporting cast features Mary Alden, Priscilla Bonner, Tully Marshall, Nick Cogley, and Byron Munson. The film was released on September 19, 1920, by Goldwyn Pictures. The picture was remade in 1936 as Old Hutch starring Wallace Beery in Will Rogers' role.

Cast       
Will Rogers as Hutch
Mary Alden as Mrs. Hutchins
Priscilla Bonner as Ellen
Tully Marshall as Thomas Gunnison
Nick Cogley as Hiram Joy
Byron Munson as Thomas Gunnison Jr.
Edouard Trebaol as A Child
Jeanette Trebaol as A Child
Yves Trebaol as A Child

References

External links

1920 films
1920s English-language films
Silent American comedy films
1920 comedy films
Goldwyn Pictures films
Films directed by Clarence G. Badger
American silent feature films
American black-and-white films
1920s American films